The Framingham Country Club is a golf course located in Framingham, Massachusetts, United States, about thirty-five minutes west of Boston, Massachusetts off the Massachusetts Turnpike. It is an elite, private, golf course which  has a waiting list to be a member. There is also an extensive waiting list to be a caddie.

External links
Official site
Framingham Country Club Details

Golf clubs and courses in Massachusetts
Companies based in Framingham, Massachusetts
Buildings and structures in Framingham, Massachusetts
1902 establishments in Massachusetts
Sports venues completed in 1902
Sports in Framingham, Massachusetts
Sports venues in Middlesex County, Massachusetts